Aziziya or El Azizia  ( Al ʿAzīzīyah) was one of the districts of Libya (baladiyah), located in the northwest of the country, south of Tripoli District.  The town of Aziziya was the former district's capital, and it covered an area of 1,940 square kilometers. In 2001 Aziziya became part of the Jafara District.

Climate
This was long believed to be the highest temperature ever to be recorded naturally on Earth.

Meteorological parameters began to be recorded in Libya during the Ottoman Empire (1551–1911). Temperature archives for some old meteorological stations are available in the climate directorate at the Libyan National Meteorological Centre (LNMC).

Towns
Towns in the former ‘Aziziya District:
 ‘Aziziya, capital of ‘Aziziya District until 2001
 Funduq ash Shaybani, 17 km on the trade route south of the city of ‘Aziziya
 Abu Ghaylan, 13 km on the trade route south of Funduq ash Shaybani
 An Nasiriyah, 18 km northwest of the city of ‘Aziziya
 As Sawani, 21 km north of the city of ‘Aziziya, on the road to Tripoli, and former storage site of Libya's modular "Uranium Conversion Facility" and uranium separation centrifuge.
 Asbi`ah, 14 km east of the city of ‘Aziziya and 15 km south of Tripoli International Airport
 Sawani Bin Adam, 1 km east of As Sawani

Notes

External links
 "Azizia Climate Records"  by Younis Al-Fenadi

Former districts of Libya
Extreme points of Earth